Dating Naked is an American reality dating game show shown on VH1, which debuted in July 2014. Amy Paffrath served as the host for the first two seasons and was clothed in her appearances. The first season was filmed on an island in Panama. The second season, re-titled Dating Naked: Playing for Keeps and filmed in the Philippines, premiered on July 22, 2015 and concluded on September 16, 2015.

The third season, hosted by Rocsi Diaz and filmed in Bora Bora, premiered on June 29, 2016 and concluded on September 14, 2016. On April 14, 2017, VH1 announced that Dating Naked was canceled after three seasons, though VH1 left open the possibility of a future series reboot. On February 24, 2021, it was announced that the series would be revived by Paramount+.

Summary
The show matched up several contestants who were routinely switched with other contestants. While contestants were nude most of the time, the show does not show contestants' genitals. The first season featured a new pair of contestants in each episode. There was a format change for the remaining seasons, where there were two main contestants, a male and a female, whom new contestants would join each episode to date them, in a format similar to shows such as The Bachelor.

Episodes

Series overview

Season 1

Season 2: Playing for Keeps

Season 3
The third season premiered on Wednesday, June 29, 2016.

International release

International versions

Reception
Allison Davis wrote that the show "push[es] the boundaries of courtship and creatively expand[s] the list of activities you can do in the nude," but also criticized the show's pool scenes for being too revealing. Emily Hewett described it as "the most awkward show on television." A more negative review from Time described the show as a typical reality dating show "once you (and the contestants) get used to the nudity gimmick".

Lawsuit
In August 2014, Jessie Nizewitz, a 28 year-old contestant on the third episode of Season 1, which aired on July 31, 2014, filed a lawsuit against series producers Viacom, as well as Firelight Entertainment and Lighthearted Entertainment for $10 million, after they broadcast an uncensored shot of her crotch.

Two months later, Viacom, Firelight Entertainment and Lighthearted Entertainment sought to have the lawsuit dismissed, claiming that Nizewitz was in violation of her contract in filing a lawsuit. Viacom, in its petition for dismissal held that, "Before filming began, she signed not one but three agreements, in which she expressly and repeatedly agreed (no fewer than twelve times) that she would participate and be filmed fully nude: that footage could be exhibited and distributed without restriction; that the producers would have sole discretion in how the footage was edited; that she waived any right to sue over her appearance on the show; and that she would be liable for attorneys fees should she sue in violation of her contract."

In March 2015, the lawsuit was dismissed by a New York Supreme Court judge. Nizewitz died on June 2, 2019.

See also 
 Adam Zkt. Eva
 Buying Naked
 Naked and Afraid
 Naked Attraction

References

External links 

 
 

2010s American game shows
2010s American reality television series
2014 American television series debuts
2016 American television series endings
American dating and relationship reality television series
English-language television shows
Nudity in television
VH1 original programming
Erotic television series
Television shows filmed in Panama
Television shows filmed in the Philippines
Television shows filmed in French Polynesia
Paramount+ original programming
American television series revived after cancellation